Cindy Jackson is an aesthetic consultant, author and television personality.

Biography 
Jackson is British-American based in England since 1977. ABC News reported in 2011 that Jackson had undergone a former world-record 52 cosmetic treatments, including  tooth whitening, filler injections, AHA peels, Botox, three face-lifts and liposuction," among others, with a total value of over $60,000. After 17 years in the Guinness Book of Records, Jackson lost her world record for having the most cosmetic procedures in the world. As a member of Mensa, Jackson has stated that the operations she has undergone have changed her life.

Bibliography
 Out of print.
 Out of print.

References

External links

 

1957 births
Women rock singers
Living people
People from Fremont, Ohio